Emar Acosta (La Rioja, August 20, 1904 - San Juan, October 24, 1965) was an Argentine lawyer and politician, who served as judge and provincial legislator, and was the first woman to be elected to a political role in Latin America. Her political involvement and views caused controversy, and she was arrested several times, despite her parliamentary immunity. Throughout her life, she fought for the rights of women and the poor, thus  founding the Association of Civic Culture of San Juan Women, among many others.

References

1904 births
1965 deaths
20th-century women lawyers